Acacia verniciflua, commonly known as varnish wattle, is a shrub  or small tree species that is endemic to Australia. 
It has an erect or spreading habit, growing to between 1 and 6 metres high, The phyllodes are often sticky and lustrous and vary in length, width and shape. The globular pale-yellow flowerheads appear in the leaf axils from July to November, followed by seedpods that are up to 10 cm long and unconstricted. These contain shiny black seeds. It is often found growing alongside Eucalyptus obliqua where it can dominate the understory.

Three forms identified in the Flora of Victoria (1996) have since been assigned to other species as follows:
A. verniciflua (Bacchus Marsh variant) - Acacia rostriformis
A. verniciflua (Casterton variant)  - Acacia exudans
A. verniciflua (Southern variant) - Acacia leprosa var. graveolens

The species occurs  in dry sclerophyll forest in South Australia, Victoria, New South Wales and Queensland.

References

verniciflua
Flora of Tasmania
Flora of New South Wales
Flora of Queensland
Flora of South Australia
Flora of Victoria (Australia)
Fabales of Australia